11th Hussar Regiment or 11th Hussars may refer to:

 11th Hussars, a British regiment established in 1715
 11th Hussars (Canada), a Canadian Militia regiment now part of the Sherbrooke Hussars
 11th Hussar Regiment (Austria-Hungary), established in 1762
 11th Hussar Regiment (France), established in 1793
 11th Hussar Regiment (Germany), established in 1807 as "2nd Westphalian"